WSRC (88.1 MHz) is a non-commercial FM radio station licensed to Waynetown, Indiana.  It is owned by the Calvary Chapel of Crawfordsville, Inc.  The station airs a radio format consisting of Christian talk and teaching and Christian music.  

WSRC calls itself "The Source."  Some of the national religious leaders heard on the station include David Jeremiah, Chuck Swindoll and J. Vernon McGee.

References

External links
WSRC's website

SRC